Ramshead Lake is located in Grand Teton National Park, in the U. S. state of Wyoming. Situated within Hanging Canyon, Ramshead Lake is flanked by Mount Saint John to the northwest and Symmetry Spire to the south.

References

Lakes of Grand Teton National Park